Grand Duchess Anastasia Mikhailovna of Russia (28 July 1860 – 11 March 1922) was by birth member of the House of Romanov and a Grand Duchess of Russia and by marriage Grand Duchess of Mecklenburg-Schwerin.

Early life 
Anastasia was born as the only daughter and second child of Grand Duke Michael Nicolaievich of Russia and his wife Princess Cecilie of Baden. Paternally, she was a granddaughter of Emperor Nicholas I of Russia.

Biography 

She was raised in the Caucasus, where she lived between 1862 and 1878 with her family. In 1879 she married Friedrich Franz III of Mecklenburg-Schwerin, who in 1883 became the reigning Grand Duke of Mecklenburg-Schwerin. The couple had three children, but her husband was plagued by ill health and they spent most of the year living abroad. The Grand Duchess never became used to her new country where she was unpopular. After the death of her husband in 1897, her visits to Schwerin were sparse.

A strong-willed, independent and unconventional woman, she caused a royal scandal when in 1902 she had a child fathered by her personal secretary. In her widowhood, she lived most of the year in the South of France. During World War I, she decided to settle in neutral Switzerland, living in Lausanne. She died following a stroke a few years later.

Issue 

Grand Duchess Anastasia Mikhailovna and her husband,  Friedrich Franz III, Grand Duke of Mecklenburg-Schwerin, had three children:
Duchess Alexandrine of Mecklenburg-Schwerin (24 December 1879 – 28 December 1952), who married King Christian X of Denmark on 26 April 1898. They had two sons.
Frederick Francis IV, Grand Duke of Mecklenburg-Schwerin (9 April 1882 – 17 November 1945), who married Princess Alexandra of Hanover on 7 June 1904. They had five children.
Duchess Cecilie of Mecklenburg-Schwerin (20 September 1886 – 6 May 1954), who married Wilhelm, German Crown Prince on 6 June 1905. They have had six children.

Grand Duchess Anastasia Mikhailovna also had an illegitimate son with Vladimir Alexandrovich Paltov (1874 – 1944):
Alexis Louis de Wenden (23 December 1902 – 7 July 1976), who married Paulette Seux on 25 January 1929. They had two daughters: Xénia Anastasie Germaine Louis de Wenden (born 1930, who married Alain Brulé), and Anastasie Alexandrine Paule Louis de Wenden (1935–1995).

Ancestry

Notes

Bibliography
 Alexander, Grand Duke of Russia. Once a Grand Duke. Cassell, London, 1932.
 Beéche, Arturo. The Grand Duchesses. Eurohistory, 2004. 
 Domin, Marie-Agnes. Anastasia Mikailovna Romanova, Editions Atlantica, 2002. .
 Cockfield, Jamie H. White Crow. Praeger, 2002.
 Mateos Sainz de Medrano. Ricardo. A Child of The Caucasus. Royalty Digest, Vol 3, N 1. July 1993.
 Michael, Prince of Greece. Jewels of the Tsars. The Vedome Press, 2006.
 Yussupov, Felix. Lost Splendor, 1952.
 Zeepvat, Charlotte. The Camera and the Tsars. Sutton Publishing, 2004, .
 Zeepvat, Charlotte. The other Anastasia: A woman who loved and who lived. Royalty Digest Quarterly. N2 2006. ISSN 1653-5219.

External link

1860 births
1922 deaths
House of Holstein-Gottorp-Romanov
House of Mecklenburg-Schwerin
Russian grand duchesses
Royalty from Saint Petersburg
Duchesses of Mecklenburg-Schwerin
Hereditary Grand Duchesses of Mecklenburg-Schwerin
Grand Duchesses of Mecklenburg-Schwerin
Emigrants from the Russian Empire to Switzerland
Emigrants from the Russian Empire to France
19th-century people from the Russian Empire
19th-century women from the Russian Empire